Dover Kosashvili (born 8 December 1966) is an Israeli film director and screenwriter of Georgian-Jewish descent. He has directed five films since 1998. His film, Late Marriage, was screened in the Un Certain Regard section at the 2001 Cannes Film Festival.

Filmography
 Im Hukim (1998)
 Hatuna Meuheret (Late Marriage) (2001)
 Matana MiShamayim (A Gift from the Sky) (2003)
 Infiltration (2009)
 The Duel (2010)
 Ravaka Plus (Single Plus) (2012)
 Zug Yonim (Love Birds) (2017)

References

External links

"Israeli Film Director: Countrymen's Hits Abroad Are 'Mediocre or Worse'". Ido Rosen. Haaretz. 11 November 2009. 

1966 births
Living people
Israeli film directors
Israeli male screenwriters
Israeli people of Georgian-Jewish descent
Film directors from Georgia (country)
Screenwriters from Georgia (country)